Crorepati may refer to:
Kaun Banega Crorepati, an Indian game show based on Who Wants to Be a Millionaire?
Kya Aap Banaingay Crorepati?, a Pakistani version of the game show